Raupo may refer to:

Typha orientalis, a wetland plant
Raupo, a fictional town in the Footrot Flats cartoon
Raupo Press a small press in New Zealand previously known as Reed Publishing and now part of the Penguin Group.
Raupo, an 1876 iron barque which sailed in New Zealand and was deliberately sunk in Lyttelton Harbour.